During the 1960–61 English football season, Everton F.C. competed in the Football League First Division.

Season summary
In the 1960–61 season, the Toffees finished in 5th place, their highest post-war position but despite that, Johnny Carey was infamously sacked in the back of a taxi by director John Moores. As a result, the infamous fans jibe, 'Taxi for xxxxxx!' has become a staple insult offered to any manager facing the threat of the sack. Carey was then replaced in April by Harry Catterick.

Final league table

P = Matches played; W = Matches won; D = Matches drawn; L = Matches lost; F = Goals for; A = Goals against; GA = Goal average; GD = Goal difference; Pts = Points

Results
Everton's score comes first

Legend

Football League First Division

FA Cup

League Cup

Squad

References

Everton F.C. seasons
Everton